Cys Cache is a lake in Beaver County, Utah, United States.

Cys Cache derives its name from Cyrus Davis, a wildlife official who planted fish in the lake.

References

Lakes of Utah
Lakes of Beaver County, Utah
Fishlake National Forest